The Airspeed AS.1 Tern was a 1930s British glider aircraft, the first aircraft built by Airspeed Limited at York and one of the earliest British-designed gliders.

Development
The Tern was designed by Hessell Tiltman & Nevil Shute Norway to gain records and publicity for the new Airspeed company, as well as to attract orders for new aircraft. Designed for hill- and cloud-soaring, the Tern was a wood-and-fabric cantilever monoplane. It was designed to be dismantled and was advertised for sale at £248. Only two examples were built. Shute himself was the pilot on the Tern's first test flight.

On 24 August 1931 the Tern was flown by Carli Magersuppe from Stoupe Brow, Ravenscar to Scarborough to gain the first British distance record of 8.3 miles (13.4 km). The glider flew a total of  but only the straight-line distance counted towards the record.

The Tern was constructed of wood with a fabric-covered two-spar cantilevered tapered wing with no dihedral. A plywood leading edge was fitted but only as an aerodynamic fairing and not as primary structure. The trapezoidal-section fuselage had plywood lower sides and fabric-covered top decking as well as a generous cockpit in the leading edge of the centre-section.

The Tern had some success in establishing gliding records but only one was completed and parts for one more were produced. After languishing through the Second World War the Tern was re-built, using parts from both airframes, but did little flying.

Specifications

References

Simons, Martin. Sailplanes 1920-1945 2nd revised edition. EQIP Werbung und Verlag G.m.b.H.. Königswinter. 2006. 

1930s British sailplanes
Glider aircraft
Tern
Aircraft first flown in 1931